The 2013 BYU Cougars football team represented Brigham Young University in the 2013 NCAA Division I FBS football season. The Cougars, led by head coach Bronco Mendenhall, played their home games at LaVell Edwards Stadium. This was the third year BYU competed as an independent. They finished the season 8–5. They were invited to the Fight Hunger Bowl where they lost to Washington, 31–16.

Before the season

Coaching changes
After the 2012 Poinsettia Bowl, longtime assistant coach Lance Reynolds announced his retirement after 33 years of service at BYU (29 years as a coach and 4 years as a player). To fill the vacancy, BYU looked to an old face. Longtime assistant Robert Anae was brought back from the University of Arizona as the new offensive coordinator. In addition to his position as the offensive coordinator, Anae was given the responsibility of helping Bronco evaluate the entire offensive staff.

On January 8, Mark Weber left BYU for Utah State after six years with the Cougars. Weber was hired by the Aggies as the new assistant head coach and as the offensive line coach.

On Monday, January 14, Coach Mendenhall informed running backs coach and recruiting coordinator Joe DuPaix and tight ends Coach Ben Cahoon that their contracts would not be renewed for the 2013 season. It was also revealed that Brandon Doman's status with the university was uncertain for 2013. BYU announced they had interviewed Max Hall, Paul Peterson (Sacramento State offensive coordinator), and Steve Clark (Southern Utah offensive coordinator) for the position of quarterback coach for the 2013 season.

On Tuesday, January 15, BYU announced that two coaches had been hired as part of the new offensive staff for the 2013 season. Garett Tujague was hired and Mark Atuaia was moved from the athletic director's office as the assistant to the AD over to the football coaching staff. BYU's official press release said that positions wouldn't be announced until the staff was finalized, but common rumors stated that Tujague would become the offensive lines coach and Atuaia would become the running backs coach.

On Wednesday, January 16, BYU announced that Aaron Roderick had been hired as an assistant coach on the offensive side at BYU. Roderick was to join the Cougars after 8 years of service at Utah, and it was believed that he would serve as the receivers coach. Less than 24 hours after accepting the position at BYU, Roderick changed his mind and decided to return to the Utes for the 2013 season.

The final coaching staff members were announced on Friday, February 15. Jason Beck was hired as the quarterback coach and Guy Holliday was hired as the wide receiver coach.

On February 28, Bronco Mendenhall announced that Nick Howell had been promoted to the defensive coordinator position, Robert Anae was assistant head coach, and Kelly Popinga would serve as special teams coordinator.

2013 recruits

DeBeikes, England, Laulu-Pututau, Shumway, and Tapusoa served church missions right after graduation and did not join the BYU team until the 2015 season.

2013 returning missionaries
Eight return missionaries, 4 on the offensive side and 4 on the defensive side, returned and played their first action with BYU during the 2013 season.

2013 departures
The following Cougars graduated, transferred, or chose to serve two-year church missions after the 2012 season and didn't return to the team in 2013.

Spring Game
The annual Spring Game was held on Saturday, March 30, 2013. Instead of doing a traditional 20-minute scrimmage with 5 minutes per quarter, the Cougars held a 50-play scrimmage that became more of a 75-play scrimmage. More than 12,000 fans turned out to see the first team offense and second team defense (titled BYU West) take on the second team offense and first team defense (BYU East). Several expected starters, including QB Taysom Hill, who had not been cleared for full contact, were held out of the scrimmage. The offense scored four touchdowns and added one field goal in a 15–13 victory by the West team.

Pre-season honors

Media

2013 Media Day
Football Media Day was held on Wednesday, June 26, at 10 AM MDT. BYU announced  a 2-for-1 series with USC scheduled to begin in 2019, a 2015 affiliation with the Poinsettia Bowl, and the 3-year extension of head coach Bronco Mendenhall, pushing his contract through the 2016 season. New BYUtv Sports reporter Spencer Linton conducted webchats with some of BYU's returning starters, new starters, and head coaches. Trevor Matich returned from ESPN to act as a special analyst alongside BYUtv analysts Blaine Fowler, Jan Jorgensen, and Brian Logan. A TV special titled LaVell Edwards and the BYU Quarterback Factory was also held. Dave McCann acted as the panel host alongside LaVell Edwards, Robbie Bosco, Ty Detmer, Gifford Nielsen, Steve Sarkisian, Gary Sheide, Marc Wilson, Steve Young, Jim McMahon, and others.

Cougar IMG Sports Network affiliates
KSL 102.7 FM and 1160 AM- Flagship Station (Salt Lake City/ Provo, UT and ksl.com)BYU Radio- Nationwide (Dish Network 980, Sirius XM 143, and byuradio.org)KIDO- Boise, ID [football only]KTHK- Blackfoot/ Idaho Falls/ Pocatello/ Rexburg, IDKMGR- Manti, UTKSUB- Cedar City, UTKDXU- St. George, UTKSHP- Las Vegas, NV [football only]

Roster

Schedule
BYU faced schools from every BCS conference except the SEC: the ACC, Big Ten, Big 12, Pac-12, and the AAC.  Notre Dame was an additional Top 25 opponent, and BYU also played rivalry games against Boise State and traditional rival Utah State. BYU played in the 2013 Fight Hunger Bowl.

Game summaries

Virginia

BYUtv Panel: Alema Harrington, Brian Logan, David Nixon, and Andy Boyce. Sideline Reporters: Dave McCann and Blaine Fowler
Sources:

BYU and Virginia entered into the game with both teams debuting new offenses and hoping for the best. Bad news occurred for Cougar fans before game time as it was revealed Cody Hoffman had an ankle sprain and would be unable to play. The first quarter saw BYU's total yardage as nearly quadruple that of Virginia's, but neither team was able to score. As the two teams got ready to start the second quarter, lightning struck within 15 miles of the stadium. Both teams were sent to their locker rooms, and a two-hour lightning delay began.

The lightning also caused havoc with the TV arrangements. ESPNU had another game to start broadcasting at 7 PM, but BYU at Virginia would only be in the second quarter. As a result, ESPN decided to move the entire nation, except for those in the states of Virginia and Utah, to the Washington State/ Auburn ESPNU game while the markets of Utah and Virginia would remain with the BYU/ Virginia game. The game would be made available on ESPN3 for the rest of the nation. However viewers on DirecTV and Dish Network had no choice but to move to the next game as they couldn't put in territorial restrictions. Dish Network was able to air the remainder of the game on Channel 147, an ESPN alternate station, but DirecTV fans were to go unhappy, unless they had internet access to ESPN3.

The Cougars were able to strike first in the second quarter, and it provided hope for the Cougars as the Cougars had only lost three times in the Bronco Mendenhall era when BYU scored first. However a 53-yard field goal and a blocked punt gave Virginia the momentum, and they never looked back.

Weather continued to cause problems for BYU and Virginia as the third quarter began. A heavy rain storm began, and while the degrees of heaviness would rotate throughout the remainder of the game, the rain would cause both teams to shift to a ground and pound attack strategy. Virginia would score 12 unanswered points, culminating in a great toe drag by Darius Jennings to give the Cavaliers the lead.

Despite the toe drag, it would be the Virginia defense that would save the day for the Cavaliers. On a 3rd and 7 Hill threw the ball to sophomore running back Jamaal Williams, but the slickness of the ball and the continual rain caused it to slip from his hands. The ball would land in the hands of Virginia safety Anthony Harris. After a quick lateral Williams was able to bring the Cavs down at BYU's 13 yard line, but one play later Virginia would score the game's final touchdown. The Cougars would complete a 50-yard pass on the last play of the game, but it was too little, too late.

Jamaal Williams led the Cougars with 33 carries for 144 yards. Taysom Hill carried the ball 11 times for 42 yards and a touchdown. He would also throw the ball 13 times for 175 yards and a touchdown.

BYU owned every statistical category with 187 yards rushing compared to Virginia's 109. They would also out pass Virginia 175 to 114. However Virginia's wise ball control (34:09 to BYU's 25:51) allowed them to control the clock for 3 out of 4 quarters, and in the end it was the ball control, special teams blunders, a safety, and an interception that gave the Cavaliers a narrow 19 to 16 win.

Despite the loss, BYU did manage to compile one award for the week.
 Scott Arellano
 FBS Independent Special Teams Player of the Week

Texas

BYUtv Panel: Alema Harrington, Brian Logan, and David Nixon
Sources:

At first many fans thought the game would be a repeat of last week as a severe thunderstorm hit Provo at 4 PM. Kickoff was immediately postponed from 5:06 PM as a 55-minute warmup was still required for both teams. Some of the players were able to go to the fans and interact with them before heading back to the locker room during the delay, giving the fans additional motivation. Nearly an hour after the storm hit, a start time of 6:52 was announced, resulting in a 1-hour, 46 minute lightning delay. The rain would continue on and off throughout the rest of the game, but no one expected the performance BYU put up.

Sophomore Quarterback Taysom Hill found lane after lane and was able to dominate the Texas line, setting a BYU record with 15.2 yards per rush, but he wasn't alone. For the second consecutive game Jamaal Williams would go over the century mark, and Paul Lasike would also add 86 rushing yards. It was part of a record performance for BYU- 550 rushing yards, which also became the most rushing yardage Texas has ever given up. For individual totals Hill had 259 yards rushing, the second highest rushing total for a BYU QB, and Williams had 182 yards rushing. Hill's passing yardage was less than impressive (9–26 with 129 yards and 1 interception), but with the running lanes throughout BYU was able to dominate and shock the #15 ranked Longhorns.

After the game, BYU swept the FBS Independent Player of the Week Awards and won a lot of other national attention awards.
 Taysom Hill
 Athlon Sports National Player of the Week
 CBSSports.com Offensive Player of the Week
 Davey O'Brien Quarterback of the Week Honorable Mention
 FBS Offensive Independent Player of the Week
 College Sports Madness Independent Offensive Player of the Week
 Justin Sorensen
 FBS Independent Special Teams Player of the Week
 College Football Performance Awards Honorable Mention Placekicker of the Week
 Lou Groza Collegiate Place-Kicker Award Star of the Week
 Jamaal Williams
 College Football Performance Awards Honorable Mention Running Back of the Week
 Alani Fua
 FBS Independent Defensive Player of the Week
 College Football Performance Awards Honorable Mention Linebacker of the Week
 Tostitos Fiesta Bowl National Team of the Week

Utah

The week of the game, BYU linebacker Spencer Hadley was suspended 5 games for an honor code violation.
Sources:

Middle Tennessee

Sources:

Coming into the game, it was bad news for BYU from the start.
Jammal Williams was out with a concussion
Cody Hoffman was suspended for 1 game for violating team rules
Michael Yeck was back starting at RG after an injury to Brock Stringhman during the week.

Utah State

BYUtv Panel: Dave McCann, Alema Harrington, Brian Logan, and Blaine Fowler. Sideline Reporter:  Spencer Linton
Sources:

Georgia Tech

Sources:

On Friday it was announced that Spencer Hadley's suspension had been reduced to 3-games, and that he would be eligible to play against the Yellow Jackets if the coach would put him in. The news was only a small spark for the Cougars as they headed into the game. Running back's Jamaal Williams and Algernon Brown would run for their first TD's of the season, and Taysom Hill showed his passing performance against the Aggies wasn't a fluke, hitting Cody Hoffman for a 45-yard touchdown on their first possession of the game. Hill would later add a rushing touchdown of his own. The Cougars got out to an early 24–10 lead on the Yellow Jackets, and that lead would not let up. Hadley would play the entire second half, getting some 3rd down conversion sacks and tackles that prevented the Yellow Jackets from rallying. In the end BYU's defense would hold their 12th straight opponent under 21-points, and the Cougars would pick up their 3rd consecutive win. Hill completed 19/27 for 244 yards and a touchdown. Williams carried the ball 17 times for 89 yards while Hill added 15 carried for 87 yards. Hoffman led the Cougars receiving with 99-yards, and Falslev joined him with 69-yards. The Cougars D would score a touchdown for the third-consecutive game.

Houston

Sources:

A high flying first half led to a number of new records for the BYU football team. The two sets of Cougars combined for 701 yards of offense and 72 points in the first half (456 for BYU, 245 for Houston). With his first reception of the game, Cody Hoffman became the all-time leading receiver in BYU history, surpassing TE Dennis Pitta. With his touchdown reception, Hoffman tied Austin Collie for the most touchdown receptions made by a receiver at BYU. Taysom Hill became the first person to rush for more than 100 yards against Houston this season. BYU ran a record 115 plays, tying the all-time number of plays run in a FBS game by one-team and shattering their previous record of 95-plays in a game. BYU also made 41-first downs in the game, a new mark for most first downs in a game, and the 76-yard touchdown pass to Daniel Spencer became the most yardage the Cougars have given up in a pass this season.

Boise State

Sources:

Wisconsin

Sources:

Idaho State

Sources:

Notre Dame

Sources:

Nevada

Sources:

Fight Hunger Bowl

Sources:

References

BYU
BYU Cougars football seasons
BYU Cougars football